In enzymology, a trans-aconitate 3-methyltransferase is an enzyme that catalyzes the chemical reaction

S-adenosyl-L-methionine + trans-aconitate  S-adenosyl-L-homocysteine + (E)-2-(methoxycarbonylmethyl)butenedioate

Thus, the two substrates of this enzyme are S-adenosyl methionine and trans-aconitate, whereas its two products are S-adenosylhomocysteine and (E)-2-(methoxycarbonylmethyl)butenedioate.

This enzyme belongs to the family of transferases, specifically those transferring one-carbon group methyltransferases.  The systematic name of this enzyme class is S-adenosyl-L-methionine:(E)-prop-1-ene-1,2,3-tricarboxylate 3'-O-methyltransferase.

References

 
 

EC 2.1.1
Enzymes of unknown structure